Sts. Peter and Paul Church is a Russian Orthodox church  on St. Paul Island, Alaska.  The current church, built in 1907, was listed on the National Register of Historic Places in 1980. Now it is under Diocese of Alaska of the Orthodox Church in America.

A first church was built in 1779 "according to legend";  a second church was built in 1819 atop the island's tallest hill.  The current church was built in 1907, and was then "one of the most ambitiously designed and effectively executed small churches of the Byzantine tradition in Alaska."  Its onion domes, however, were repeatedly damaged in storms, and have been replaced.

See also
National Register of Historic Places listings in Aleutians West Census Area, Alaska

References

External links

 with service schedules and brief history

20th-century Eastern Orthodox church buildings
Buildings and structures in Aleutians West Census Area, Alaska
Churches on the National Register of Historic Places in Alaska
Churches completed in 1907
Russian Orthodox church buildings in Alaska
Tourist attractions in Aleutians West Census Area, Alaska
Historic American Buildings Survey in Alaska
Buildings and structures on the National Register of Historic Places in Aleutians West Census Area, Alaska
Historic district contributing properties in Alaska
Saint Paul Island (Alaska)